The Chaco earthcreeper (Tarphonomus certhioides) is a species of bird in the family Furnariidae.
It is found in Argentina, Bolivia, and Paraguay.
Its natural habitat is subtropical or tropical dry shrubland.

References

 SACC (2007). Recognize the genus Tarphonomus for two "Upucerthia". Accessed 2008-10-28.

Chaco earthcreeper
Birds of the Gran Chaco
Chaco earthcreeper
Taxonomy articles created by Polbot